VPO can stand for:

 Vice President of Operations 
 Vapor pressure osmometry
 Vernonia Peak Observatory
 Vienna Philharmonic Orchestra
 Village Police Officer, not to be confused with Village Public Safety Officer (VPSO)
 Village Post Office in India